Aisling Dunphy (born 1992) is a camogie player and student. She played in the 2009 All Ireland camogie final. Aisling has won three All- Ireland Under-16 and four All-Ireland Minor medals as well as two All-Ireland inter-provincial colleges titles and a national Junior colleges crown. She has eleven Leinster medals for Under- 14 (two), Under- 16 (three) and Minor (six), and also won two All-Ireland colleges sevens titles and two Leinster Junior colleges.

References

External links 
 Official Camogie Website
 Kilkenny Camogie Website
 of 2009 championship in On The Ball Official Camogie Magazine
 https://web.archive.org/web/20091228032101/http://www.rte.ie/sport/gaa/championship/gaa_fixtures_camogie_oduffycup.html Fixtures and results for the 2009 O'Duffy Cup
 All-Ireland Senior Camogie Championship: Roll of Honour
 Video highlights of 2009 championship Part One and part two
 Video Highlights of 2009 All Ireland Senior Final
 Report of All Ireland final in Irish Times Independent and Examiner

1992 births
Living people
Kilkenny camogie players